Pietro Balan (September 3, 1840 – 1893) was an Italian Catholic journalist and historian.  He used newly opened Vatican archive material to write about the Reformation.

Life
He was born at Este, Veneto on 3 September 1840, and was educated in the seminary at Padua, where he was appointed professor in 1862. He was director of the Venetian journal La Libertà Cattolica in 1865, and of the Modena journal Diritto Cattolico in 1867. In 1879 he became subarchivist of the Vatican, but retired (or was dismissed) on a pretext of poor health four years later, moving to Pragatto in the province of Bologna. He was nominated chamberlain by Pope Leo XIII in 1881, and domestic prelate in the following year; in 1883 he was appointed referendary of the Papal segnatura, and was also created a commander of the Order of Franz Joseph.

Works (incomplete list) 
 Monumenta reformationis Lutheranæ (Ratisbon, 1883–4). 
 Fra Paolo Sarpi (Venice, 1887)

References 

Attribution

External links
 
 

1840 births
1893 deaths
People from the Province of Padua
Italian historians of religion
19th-century Italian Roman Catholic priests
19th-century Italian historians